Milica Kostić (born 21 December 1997) is a Serbian footballer who plays as a goalkeeper who plays for Serbian Women's Super League club Spartak Subotica and has appeared for the Serbia women's national team.

Career
Kostić has been capped for the Serbia national team, appearing for the team during the 2019 FIFA Women's World Cup qualifying cycle.

References

External links
 
 
 

1997 births
Living people
Serbian women's footballers
Serbia women's international footballers
Women's association football goalkeepers
ŽFK Spartak Subotica players